is a JR West Geibi Line station located in Onuka, Tōjō-chō, Shōbara, Hiroshima Prefecture, Japan. Onuka Station is a kantaku station.

History
1935-12-20: Onuka Station opens as the terminal station on the Sanshin Line (now the Geibi Line) between Tōjō Station and Onuka Station
1936-10-10: Onuka Station becomes a midway stop between Tōjō Station and Bingo Ochiai Station
1987-04-01: Japan National Railways is privatized, and Onuka Station becomes a JR West station

Station layout
Onuka Station features one platform. Two platforms were originally in operation, handling two lines, but after one of the lines ceased operation, the second platform stopped being used and the station now runs on one platform.

Shōbara's Onuka Elementary School is located nearby.

Highway access
Japan National Route 314
Route 236 (Onuka Teishajō Route)
Route 448 (Shimochidori Onuka Teishajō Route)

Connecting lines
All lines are JR West lines.
Geibi Line
Uchina Station — Onuka Station — Dōgoyama Station

External links
 JR West

Geibi Line
Railway stations in Hiroshima Prefecture
Railway stations in Japan opened in 1935
Shōbara, Hiroshima